San Marino competed at the 2017 World Games held in Wrocław, Poland.

Medalists

Boules sports 

Enrico Dall'Olmo and Jacopo Frisoni won the silver medal in the men's Raffa Doubles event.

References 

Nations at the 2017 World Games
2017 in Sammarinese sport